Ihioma is a community in the Orlu section of Imo State in Southeastern Nigeria.

The area has a school. Soil studies have been conducted in the area. The area has seen conflict from Biafra separatists. Programs for displaced children have been established in the area.

References

Populated places in Imo State